Alexander originally Sándor von Wagner (April 16, 1838 – January 19, 1919) was a Hungarian painter.

Biography 

Wagner was born in Pesth. After graduating from the Real-Gymnasium in his hometown at the age of nineteen, he entered the Academy of Fine Arts at Vienna, where he was a student of Henrik Weber. The following year, he switched to the Royal Academy of Fine Arts at Munich and was taught by Professor Karl von Piloty from 1856 to 1864. From 1869 to 1910 he was professor in history painting at the Munich Academy. His themes were history paintings and Hungarian life scenes in particular. A portrait of Von Wagner painted by Franz Lachner belongs to the collection of the Gebrüder-Lachner-Museum in Rain since 2003. Among his students were Pál Szinyei Merse, Emil Wiesel, Anton Ažbe, Franciszek Żmurko.

Von Wagner died in Munich, where he is buried in the Old Southern Cemeterey.

Works 

His most famous work is The Chariot Race (now at the Manchester Art Gallery), which he painted for the Vienna Exposition (1873) and then expanded to a larger size for the Columbian Exposition (Chicago Fair) of 1893. The painting depicts the close of a chariot race in the Circus Maximus in Ancient Rome, presided over by Emperor Domitian. Chariot Race was completed in 1882 just two years after the publication of  Ben-Hur.  The painting depicts the loss of a wheel of a chariot at the height of the race.  In the original book the wheel is "crushed", in the painting it is shown intact spinning off to the left.

In the painting  After the Hunt (1864) Wagner portrayed his wife Bertha von Oldenburg in the circle of an elegant company of hunters, dressed in the historical costumes from the period of Mathias Corvinus. Another famous work was a round panorama of old Rome, titled Das alte Rom mit dem Triumphzuge Kaiser Constantin’s im Jahre 312 n.Chr., which he painted in cooperation with Josef Bühlmann in Munich in 1888. The painting was destroyed, and repainted by Yadegar Asisi in the Leipzig Panometer.

Further works (selection)
 After the Hunt (Mathias Corvinus) 
 Titusz Dugovics opfert sich in der Schlacht um Belgrad (Titusz Dugovics Sacrifices himself in the Battle of Belgrade), 1859
 Königin Izabella's Abschied aus Transsylvanien (Queen Izabella's farewell from Transylvania)
 Markttag
 Mátyás besiegt Holubár (Mátyás defeats Holubár, fresco), Hungarian State Opera House, 1865
 Pferdetrieb auf der Hortobagyer Puszta in Ungarn, around 1880
 Das Wagenrennen, 1882, today in the Manchester Art Gallery
 Wagenrennen im Circus Maximus in Rom zur Zeit des Domitian
 Ungarisches Fuhrwerk
 decoration of the "Saal der Republiken" (hall of the republics), Hamburg Rathaus, 1899 "The Chariot Race" (Manchester Art Gallery, England)

References and notes

External links 

 

19th-century Austrian painters
19th-century Hungarian painters
Austrian male painters
20th-century Austrian painters
20th-century Hungarian painters
Hungarian expatriates in Austria
Hungarian nobility
People from Pest, Hungary
1838 births
1919 deaths
Academic staff of the Academy of Fine Arts, Munich
Academy of Fine Arts, Munich alumni
Academy of Fine Arts Vienna alumni
19th-century painters of historical subjects
19th-century German male artists
20th-century Austrian male artists